Ophiusa melaconisia  is a moth of the family Erebidae. It is found in Africa, including Zimbabwe and South Africa.

References

Ophiusa
Lepidoptera of South Africa
Lepidoptera of Zimbabwe
Moths of Sub-Saharan Africa
Moths described in 1905